Montagu House (sometimes spelled "Montague") was a late 17th-century mansion in Great Russell Street in the Bloomsbury district of London, which became the first home of the British Museum. The first house on the site was destroyed by fire in 1686. The rebuilt house was sold to the British Museum in 1759, and demolished in the 1840s to make way for the present larger building.

Construction
The house was actually built twice, both times for the same man, Ralph Montagu, 1st Duke of Montagu. The late 17th century was Bloomsbury's most fashionable era, and Montagu purchased a site which is now in the heart of London but which then backed onto open fields (the Long Fields).

First house
His first house was designed by the English architect and scientist Robert Hooke, an architect of moderate ability whose style was influenced by French planning and Dutch detailing, and was built between 1675 and 1679. Admired by contemporaries, it had a central block and two service blocks flanking a large courtyard and featured murals by the Italian artist Antonio Verrio. The French painter Jacques Rousseau also contributed wall paintings. In 1686, the house was destroyed by fire.

Second house
The house was rebuilt to the designs of an otherwise little known Frenchman called Pouget. This Montagu House was by some margin the grandest private residence constructed in London in the last two decades of the 17th century. The main façade was of seventeen bays, with a slightly projecting three bay centre and three bay ends, which abutted the service wings of the first mansion. The house was of two main storeys, plus basement and a prominent mansard roof with a dome over the centre. The planning was in the usual French form of the time, with state apartments leading from a central saloon. The interiors, decorated by French artists, were admired by Horace Walpole and were probably comparable to the surviving state apartments at Boughton House in Northamptonshire, which were built for the same patron at the same time.

History
In the early 18th century, Bloomsbury began to decline gently from a fashionable aristocratic district to a more middle-class enclave, and the 2nd Duke of Montagu abandoned his father's house to move to Whitehall. He built himself a more modest residence which was later replaced with an opulent mansion by his Victorian descendant, Walter Montagu Douglas Scott, 5th Duke of Buccleuch: see Montagu House, Whitehall. Montagu House in Bloomsbury was sold to the Trustees of the British Museum in 1759 and was the home of that institution until it was demolished in the 1840s to make way for larger premises.

In popular culture
In fiction, the House appears in Neal Stephenson's The Baroque Cycle as Ravenscar House with Daniel Waterhouse as the architect in place of Hooke.

See also
 Montagu House, Whitehall
 Montagu House, Portman Square
 Montagu House, Blackheath
 Charles de La Fosse
 Noble Households – book with Montagu House inventories, 1709 and 1733

References

Bibliography
 Colvin, Howard, A Biographical Dictionary of British Architects, 1600–1840. New Haven, CT.; London: Yale University Press for the Paul Mellon Centre for Studies in British Art, 2008  
 Cornforth, John, Early Georgian Interiors. New Haven, CT.; London: Yale University Press for the Paul Mellon Centre for Studies in British Art, 2004, pp. 116, 183  
 Murdoch, Tessa (ed.), Noble Households: Eighteenth-Century Inventories of Great English Houses. A Tribute to John Cornforth. Cambridge: John Adamson, 2006, pp. 11–48  
 Pearce, David, London's Mansions: The Palatial Houses of the Nobility. London, B. T. Batsford, 2001  

British Museum
Former houses in the London Borough of Camden
Buildings and structures in Bloomsbury
Buildings and structures demolished in 1842
Demolished buildings and structures in London